The Greek Catholic Seminary in Zagreb is the oldest Greek Catholic seminary in the world outside Rome. This Major seminary has been in continuous operation since 1681. It is the major education institution of the Greek Catholic church in Croatia, Bosnia and Herzegovina and Slovenia. Historically it played an important role in the Illyrian movement.

History 
To improve education among the Uskoks in Croatia and Slavonia, bishop Pavao Zorčić established 1680 this seminary in the center of Zagreb. The small house was ready for operation one year later and was housing the rector with assistants and among a dozen students visiting the College or the University of the Jesuits in Zagreb. The seminary had a byzantine Chapel, study rooms and a Refectory.

Over the years the seminary grew and the building was expanded. After a destruction by fire bishop Vasilije Božičković rebuilt the seminary and it became the first two floor building in Zagreb. He added a church dedicated to Basil of Caesarea which became eventually the Greek Catholic parish church in Zagreb. Later, after the huge destrucions of the 1880 Zagreb earthquake a new splendid seminary and parish church dedicated to Cyril and Methodius was erected by bishop Ilija Hranilović and executed by the renowned architect Hermann Bollé.

The rectors of the seminary and the students played a distinctive role in the Greek Catholic Church in Croatia, but not less in Croatian society, being the major intellectuals and defenders of the unity of the Eastern Orthodox Church with the Catholic Church in Croatia.

Rectors 
 Đuro Germiniković  (1688-?)
 P. Teodor Strahinić OSBM (ca. 1700)
 vl. Grgur Jugović (1702-?)
 Franjo Novak (1710-?)
 vl. Teofil Pašić (1738–1739)
 Simeon Bulić (1742-?)
 Ignacije Latković (1772–1776)
 Atanazije Gvozdanović (1776–1779)
 vl. Silvestar Bubanović (1780–1781)
 Janko Rajaković (1781–1782)
 vl. Konstantin Stanić (1782–1785, 1807–1809)
 Tomo Čučić (Layperson, 1794–1796)
 Antun Tumara (1800–1807)
 vl. Gabre Smičiklas (1809–1810)
 Konstantin Poturičić (1810– 1812)
 Simeon Čučić (1812–1821)
 Bazilije Božičković (1830–1831)
 Nikola Malić (1831–1837) 
 Janko Goleš (1837–1846) 
 Janko Predović (1846–1849) 
 dr. Petar Stić (1849–1851) 
 Pavao Bratelj (1851–1860) 
 Bazilije Poturičić (1860–1861) 
 Marko Stanić (1861–1866) 
 Tomo Vidović (1866–1871) 
 prof. Gabro Smičiklas (1871–1877) 
 ak. prof. dr. Tadija Smičiklas (Layperson, 1877–1882) 
 Vladimir Laboš (1882–1885) 
 prof. dr. Anton Franki (1885–1891) 
 Andrija Segedi (1891–1897) 
 dr. Dane Šajatović (1897–1902) 
 vl. dr. Dionizije Njaradi (1902–1914) 
 dr. Tomo Severović (1914–1924) 
 dr. Ivan Djuro Višošević OSBM (1924–1956) 
 Ivan Krstitelj Pavković (1956–1990) 
 vl. Nikola Kekić (1990–2019)
 dr. Robert Rapljenović (2019–2020)
 Daniel Vranešić (2020-)

Gallery

Sources 

 
 , pages 12-13.
 , pages 78-79.

References

External links
Official website

Catholic seminaries in Europe
Catholicism in Croatia
Greek Catholic church buildings in Croatia
1681 establishments in Europe
Buildings and structures in Zagreb